Benschop may refer to:

People
 Albert Benschop (1949-2018), Dutch sociologist
 Carla Benschop (1950-2006), Dutch basketball player
 Charlison Benschop (born 1989), Dutch footballer
 Nel Benschop (1918-2005), Dutch poet
 Rogier Benschop (born 1998), Dutch professional footballer

Places
 Benschop, Utrecht, Netherlands